WXSX-LD, UHF digital channel 46, was a low-powered SonLife-affiliated television station serving the Coastal Empire area of Georgia and the Lowcountry of Southern South Carolina that was licensed to Savannah, Georgia. The station was owned by L4 Media Group. Like most former over-the-air MTV2 affiliates, it was an affiliate of The Box until that network's acquisition by Viacom in 2001.

The station's license was cancelled by the Federal Communications Commission on May 15, 2019.

Television stations in Georgia (U.S. state)
Television channels and stations established in 1994
1994 establishments in Georgia (U.S. state)
Defunct television stations in the United States
Television channels and stations disestablished in 2019
2019 disestablishments in Georgia (U.S. state)
XSX-CA